Zhangixalus smaragdinus (common names: Nepal flying frog, Günther's tree frog, giant treefrog, and others) is a species of frog in the family Rhacophoridae found in southwestern China (Yunnan, Tibet), north-eastern India, Nepal, western Thailand, and northern  Vietnam, and possibly in Bangladesh.

Zhangixalus smaragdinus lives in lowland to submontane moist evergreen forests. It lays eggs in foam nests built above pools and ponds. Outside the breeding season it is arboreal and lives high in the canopy. It is not considered threatened by the IUCN.

References

smaragdinus
Amphibians of China
Frogs of India
Amphibians of Nepal
Amphibians of Thailand
Amphibians of Vietnam
Taxonomy articles created by Polbot
Amphibians described in 1858
Taxobox binomials not recognized by IUCN